The SKAndalous All-Stars are an American ska band, composed of members of The Slackers, the Skatalites, Mephiskapheles, the Stubborn All-Stars, Agent 99, Ruder Than You, Sic & Mad, The Excalibur, Cocktaillica, The Hurtin' Buckaroos, Living Colour, Perfect Thyroid, the Cycle Sluts from Hell, and The Klezmatics, and is led by Slackers frontman Vic Ruggiero.  Considered one of the first ska supergroups, the Skandalous All Stars built their reputation on ska and reggae stylized versions of popular rock and pop tunes.  Their first two albums—Hit Me, released in 1997, and Punk Steady, released the following year—included dance-inspiring interpretations of songs by the Sex Pistols, The Clash, Blondie, Patti Smith, the Ramones, Kiss, Nirvana, Radiohead, Stevie Wonder, and White Zombie. With their third album, The Age of Insects, released in 1999, the group began focusing on the original songs of keyboardist and vocalist Ruggiero.

Discography
Hit Me – (1997), Shanachie Records
Punk Steady – (1998), Shanachie Records
Age of Insects  – (1999), Shanachie Records

Members
Ara Babajian – Drums
Nathan Breedlove – Trumpet
Dan Dulin – Trumpet
Greg Robinson – Trombone
Donna Lupie – Vocals
Chris "Skunk" Hanson – Vocals
Britt Savage – Vocals
Joe Ferry – Vocals
Doug Dubrosky – Saxophone, vocals, percussion
Marcus Geard – bass, vocals, percussion
T.J. Scanlon – Guitar
Brendog – Lead guitar
Corey Glover – Vocals
Vic Ruggiero – Vocals, piano, keyboards, percussion, guitar, stick bass
Victor Rice – bass
The Tiny Tim Irregulars – Backing vocals

External links
 The SKAndalous All Stars on AllMusic
 SKAndalous All-Stars, Rolling Stone
 Review of "Age of Insects" by Rick Anderson

American reggae musical groups
American ska musical groups
Musical groups from New York City
Third-wave ska groups